Prince Akashambatwa Mbikusita-Lewanika (born 4 February 1948) is a Zambian politician and businessman with a princely title. He was a founding member of the Movement for Multiparty Democracy. During Rupiah Banda's presidency, he served as a Presidential Advisor for Political Affairs. His sister Princess Inonge Mbikusita-Lewanika is also a diplomat and politician who stood to be President in 2001.

Works
 "Hour for Reunion: Movement for Multiparty Democracy; Conception, Dissension and Reconciliation"

References

1948 births
Living people
Lozi people
Zambian businesspeople
Movement for Multi-Party Democracy politicians
Barotseland